In computer science, run-time algorithm specialization is a methodology for creating efficient algorithms for costly computation tasks of certain kinds. The methodology originates in the field of automated theorem proving and, more specifically, in the Vampire theorem prover project.

The idea is inspired by the use of partial evaluation in optimising program translation. 
Many core operations in theorem provers exhibit the following pattern.

The specialized algorithm may be more efficient than the generic one, since it can exploit some particular properties of the fixed value . Typically,  can avoid some operations that  would have to perform, if they are known to be redundant for this particular parameter . 

Difference from partial evaluation 

There is also an important technical difference. Partial evaluation is applied to algorithms explicitly represented as codes in some programming language. We only have to imagine  when we program the specialization procedure.
All we need is a concrete representation of the specialized version . This also means that we cannot use any universal methods for specializing algorithms, which is usually the case with partial evaluation. Instead, we have to program a specialization procedure for every particular algorithm .

Specialization with compilation

The specialized algorithm has to be represented in a form that can be interpreted.
In many situations, usually when  is to be computed on many values  in a row, we can write  as a code of a special abstract machine, and we often say that  is compiled.  
Then the code itself can be additionally optimized by answer-preserving transformations that rely only on the semantics of instructions of the abstract machine.

Instructions of the abstract machine can usually be represented as records. One field of such a record stores an integer tag that identifies the instruction type, other fields may be used for storing additional parameters of the instruction, for example a pointer to another
instruction representing a label, if the semantics of the instruction requires a jump. All instructions of a code can be stored in an array, or list, or tree.

Interpretation is done by fetching instructions in some order, identifying their type
and executing the actions associated with this type. 
In C or C++ we can use a switch statement to associate 
some actions with different instruction tags. 
Modern compilers usually compile a switch statement with integer labels from a narrow range rather efficiently by storing the address of the statement corresponding to a value  in the -th cell of a special array. One can exploit this
by taking values for instruction tags from a small interval of integers.

Data-and-algorithm specialization

For example, we may have to check  first, then , then , and so on.
In such circumstances, full-scale specialization with compilation may not be suitable due to excessive memory usage.  
However, we can sometimes find a compact specialized representation 
for every , that can be stored with, or instead of, . 
We also define a variant  that works on this representation 

See also 

 Psyco, a specializing run-time compiler for Python
 multi-stage programming

References

 A. Voronkov, "The Anatomy of Vampire: Implementing Bottom-Up Procedures with Code Trees", Journal of Automated Reasoning, 15(2), 1995 (original idea)

Further reading
 A. Riazanov and A. Voronkov, "Efficient Checking of Term Ordering Constraints", Proc. IJCAR 2004, Lecture Notes in Artificial Intelligence 3097, 2004 (compact but self-contained illustration of the method)
 A. Riazanov and A. Voronkov, Efficient Instance Retrieval with Standard and Relational Path Indexing, Information and Computation, 199(1-2), 2005 (contains another illustration of the method)
 A. Riazanov, "Implementing an Efficient Theorem Prover", PhD thesis, The University of Manchester, 2003 (contains the most comprehensive description of the method and many examples)

Algorithms
Software optimization